Anne-Blandine Crochet (married Desmerger; born 8 August 1978) is a former French female canoeist who won at senior level the Wildwater Canoeing World Championships.

Medals at the World Championships
Crochet won seven medals at senior level at the Wildwater Canoeing World Championships.
Senior

References

External links
 Anne-Blandine Crochet at Aifck

1978 births
Living people
French female canoeists
Place of birth missing (living people)